The Nickel oxyacid salts are a class of chemical compounds of nickel with an oxyacid. The compounds include a number of minerals and industrially important nickel compounds.

Nickel(II) sulfate can crystallise with six water molecules yielding Retgersite or with seven making Morenosite which is isomorphic to Epsom salts. These contain the hexaquanickel(II) ion.
There is also an anhydrous form, a dihydrate and a tetrahydrate, the last two crystallised from sulfuric acid. The hexahydrate has two forms, a blue tetragonal form, and a green monoclinic form, with a transition temperature around 53 °C. The heptahydrate crystallises from water below 31.5 above this blue hexhydrate forms, and above 53.3 the green form. Heating nickel sulfate dehydrates it, and then 700° it loses sulfur trioxide, sulfur dioxide and oxygen.

Nickel sulfite can be formed by bubbling sulfur dioxide through nickel carbonate suspended in water. A solution is formed that slowly loses sulfur dioxide, and which crystallises nickel sulfite hexahydrate. Crystals are frequently in the shape of stars, caused by the two opposite triangular enantiomorphs growing base to base. nickel sulfite hexahydrate is highly piezoelectric. Optically it is uniaxial negative with refractive indexes ω=1.552 ε=1.509. When heated it dehydrates and then ends up producing nickel oxide and nickel sulfate.

Nickel thiosulfate NiS2O3 has the same structure as the magnesium salt. It has alternating layers of octahedral shaped nickel2+ hexahydrate, and tetrahedral shaped S2O32− perpendicular to the β direction. When heated to 90 °C it decomposes to form NiS. NiS2O3 can be made from BaS2O3 and NiSO4. Nickel sulfamate can be used for nickel or mixed nickel-tungsten plating. It can be formed by the action of sulfamic acid on nickel carbonate.

Nickel selenite NiSeO3 has many different hydrates, anhydrous NiSeO3, NiSeO3, NiSeO3 (which is also a mineral called ahlfeldite), and NiSeO3.

Nickel nitrate commonly crystallises with six water molecules, but can also be anhydrous, or with two, four or nine waters.
triphenylphosphine oxide nickel nitrate [(C6H6)3PO]2Ni(NO3)2 is non ionic, with nitrato as a ligand. It can be made from nickel perchlorate. It is yellow and melts at 266 °C.

Nickel carbonate NiCO3, hellyerite, crystallising with six water molecules, precipitates when an alkali bicarbonate is added to a Ni aqueous solution. Basic nickel carbonate, zaratite, with the formula Ni4CO3(OH)6(H2O)4, is produced when alkali carbonates are added to a nickel solution. Nickel phosphate, Ni3(PO4)2 is also insoluble. A number of other phosphates have been made, including nanoporous substances resembling zeolites named with "Versailles Santa Barbara" or VSB. The nanoporous nickel phosphates can accommodate sufficiently small molecules and selectively catalyze reactions on them. A nickel arsenate, Ni3(AsO4)2·8H2O occurs as the mineral annabergite.

Nickel perchlorate, Ni(ClO4)2, nickel chlorate, Ni(ClO3)2, nickel chromate (NiCrO4), nickel chromite (NiCr2O4), nickel(II) titanate, nickel bromate Ni(BrO3)2, nickel iodate (Ni(IO3)2), nickel stannate (NiSnO3) are some other oxy-salts.

The uranates include NiU2O6, NiUO4 α and β forms (orthorhombic a=6.415 Å; b=6.435 Å; c=6.835 Å), and NiU3O10.

List

References

Nickel compounds